Alcyna australis is a species of sea snail, a marine gastropod mollusk in the family Trochidae, the top snails.

Description
The size of the shell varies between 1.8 mm and 2.5 mm.
The small shell has a broadly conical shape. The 4½ whorls are rounded and increase rapidly in size.

Colour: adult whorls dull white, protoconch dark purple.

Sculpture: the base is ornamented with spaced spiral grooves. These occur, but fainter, on the penultimate whorl. The protoconch, embracing 2½ whorls, is more
strongly spirally furrowed. The large aperture is round. Into it projects from the columella a prominent tooth-like tubercle. The contrast in colour and sculpture between the apical and succeeding whorls distinguishes this species.

Distribution
This marine species is endemic to Australia and occurs off Queensland, Western Australia, Tasmania and in the Timor Sea.

References

Wilson, B. 1993. Australian Marine Shells. Prosobranch Gastropods. Kallaroo, Western Australia : Odyssey Publishing Vol. 1 408 pp.

External links
To World Register of Marine Species

australis
Gastropods of Australia
Gastropods described in 1907